SparkShorts is a series of American independent animated short films produced by Pixar Animation Studios. It consists of a program in which Pixar's employees are given six months and limited budgets to develop animated short films that were originally released on Pixar's YouTube channel, and later on Disney+.

Purl, Smash and Grab and Kitbull, the first three shorts of the SparkShorts program, were released at SIGGRAPH on August 14, 2018, before having a limited release at El Capitan Theater on January 8, 2019. Purl was officially released on February 4, 2019, on YouTube while Smash and Grab and Kitbull were released on February 11 and 18, respectively. Subsequent shorts were released on November 12, 2019, on Disney+, beginning with Float, rather than on YouTube. The shorts have been praised for their more mature themes compared to traditional Pixar feature productions.

Development
Pixar first announced the SparkShorts program on January 18, 2019. The program consists of giving employees at Pixar six months and a limited budget to develop indie short films, all of them based on personal experiences. The program was developed in order to find new filmmakers at Pixar. Bobby Rubio, writer/director of the SparkShort film Float, described the program as "different film from the kinds of films" developed at Pixar, while Lindsey Collins said that the  shorts are referred to as SparkShorts because Pixar "[wants] to discover that creative spark" in its employees. Jim Morris said: "The SparkShorts program is designed to discover new storytellers, explore new storytelling techniques, and experiment with new production workflows", adding that it "[provides] an opportunity to unlock the potential of individual artists and their inventive filmmaking approaches on a smaller scale than [Pixar's] normal fare".

Films

Released films

Purl

An anthropomorphic ball of yarn named Purl becomes the first ball of yarn to work at a company called B.R.O. Capital, but is discriminated against by her human coworkers. Purl promptly changes her appearance and personality in order to fit in, but soon finds out it may not be the best idea to do so.

Smash and Grab

Set on a futuristic Mars-like planet, two worker robots, named Smash and Grab respectively, must fight their way to freedom after choosing to escape from their exhausting work routine.

Kitbull

An independent kitten forms an unlikely friendship with an abused pit bull, whom he eventually chooses to help escape from his owners.

Float

Upon discovering his son's ability to fly, a father tries to hide his son's ability from the world. When his son's ability eventually becomes public though, the father must choose between going on the run or accepting his son.

Wind

A grandmother and her grandson find themselves scavenging debris after being trapped together in an endless chasm, and soon realize their dream of escaping.

Loop

A non-verbal girl with Autism and a chatty boy must learn to understand each other in order to fulfill a canoeing trip in an urban lake during summer camp.

Out

A young gay man who has not yet come out to his parents unexpectedly has his mind magically swapped with his dog's.

Burrow

A young rabbit tries to build the burrow of her dreams, becoming embarrassed each time she accidentally digs into a neighbor's home.

This short was originally intended to be released theatrically alongside Pixar's feature-length film Soul.

Twenty Something

The film examines the challenges and insecurities of 'adulting.' Some days you're nailing it, while other days, you're just a stack of kids hiding in a trench coat, hoping no one notices. The film's protagonist is Gia, who finds herself in this exact scenario the night of her 21st birthday.

Nona

The film centers on a widowed grandmother named Nona who plans to spend her day off by shutting out the world to watch her favorite TV show, E.W.W. Smashdown Wrestling. However, when her five-year-old granddaughter Renee is unexpectedly dropped off, Nona is caught between her two favorite things. Renee wants to play, while the normally-doting Nona wrestles with wanting to watch the Smashdown, leading to a decisive showdown between the two, and a loving compromise.

Accolades

Themes
The shorts in the SparkShorts program have been praised for having more mature themes than previous Pixar productions. Purl was praised by many as an allegory for gender inequality and feminism, which Meghan Mehta of Study Breaks noted was "mature for Pixar's target audience". Alex Reif of Laughing Place said that Smash and Grab is "[a] story about two workers who don't get the same luxuries as those who control them". Nick Skillicorn of Idea to Value felt that the SparkShorts program "enables the staff to flex their creative muscles in new ways, and try ideas which would never be accepted into a feature-length film aimed at families".

Music

Outside media

A Spark Story

On January 29, 2020, Disney announced that an untitled documentary series focusing on the SparkShorts series was in development for Disney+. The series, which provided "an immersive look at the next generation of Pixar filmmaker[s]", was executive-produced by Brian McGinn, Jason Sterman and David Gelb. On July 21, 2021, it was reported that the project was being redeveloped as a docu-film under the name A Spark Story, with McGinn, Sterman, and Gelb producing. Sterman also directed the film alongside Leanne Dare. Pixar produced the project alongside Supper Club. The documentary, charting the production of then-recent SparkShorts Twenty Something and Nona, was released on September 24, 2021.

References

External links 
 
 

Animated short film series
 
Pixar short films